Stèlla von Schöneberg, also known as Stèlla (sVs) / Stèlla G, is a pop singer, entertainer, and songwriter from Europe. She is known for her live performances and special projects in fashion (fashion week) as well as her support of the LGBTQ+ community and equal rights.  

Stèlla's album "WOT" ranked 2014 at No. 4 in Europe charts and topped the Billboard Dance No. 25 in USA.

Early life
Stèlla, began performing at the age of 10 years in a monastery in Greece, where she was taught to the Byzantine sounds. Later, she learned keyboard, but she preferred to sing. She began to sing with the bands Prosechos (Greece), Come-Out (D) and Polygon (USA). Later, she started performing in the international pop music scene as a solo artist and enrolled at Frankfurt University as a Masters of Sciences of Sports & Music Arts. Later she acquired her PhD in Sports at UCLA.

Career
Stèlla, signed with B12 Records to release her initial album, Cosmic Energy, in 2010.

In 2013, DJ Prithvi, Asia's youngest DJ, and Von Schöneberg cooperated on the single album Beat the Box, a song which was released in India for a tour.

In 2014, Asha Puthli supported her album WOT feat. Misteralf vs. Stefano Ravasini at WMC/Miami, signed by Cult Note Rec./IT. The album ranked #4 on the iTunes house-music-charts in Europe and hit #26 at the Billboard Dance40 chart USA.

In 2015, Stèlla von Schöneberg signed with Proton Music Inc. based in San Francisco USA for her further album releases.

"Roomservice", released in March 2015, was included on the album Souling Move Records/Spain and was later released in November as an exclusive release by Proton Music Inc. Stèlla von Schöneberg composed the music and lyrics, while the track was mixed and arranged by Konstatinos Pantzis.

''Afterparty''  was released in January 2016 and ranked #14 on the Reverbnation EDM Charts. Stèlla von Schöneberg composed the music and lyrics, while the track was mixed and arranged by Konstatinos Pantzis.  

In February 2016, Stèlla von Schöneberg released the album Venus Power for the WMC. Stèlla von Schöneberg composed the music and lyrics, while the track was mixed and arranged by Konstatinos Pantzis.

In March 2016 the album Chatroom was released for the Ultra Festival. Stèlla von Schöneberg composed the music and lyrics, while the track was mixed and arranged by Konstatinos Pantzis. 

In October 2016, the album Happy Birthday was released. It included various remixes. Stèlla von Schöneberg composed the music and lyrics, while the track was mixed and arranged by DjAB. It ranked #6 on Reverbnations EDM Charts London in January 2017.

In December 2016, the album Homosapian was released, including 2 songs "Homosapian" and "Catwalk". Stèlla von Schöneberg composed the music and lyrics, while the track was mixed and arranged by Janoux,  

With her song "Catwalk", Stèlla von Schöneberg opened various Fashion Week shows in Europe, USA, Dubai and India. Catwalk became a special fashion project, where talented designers around the globe, developed special capsule collections together with Stèlla. The project started by Alina in New York City with the brand LaL Couture 2013/14. 2014/15 Stèlla continued the project with Andreas Kouvaris in Greece/Europe.  In 2015/16 she collaborated with the British designer Samantha Wilson from London. In 2016/18 she collaborated with Charles of London who created a capsule collection of swim and stage wear. In 2019/20 she worked with Alexander Hitek's special glasses.

In 2017, Stèlla von Schöneberg released "Shadows" and "Boys & Girls." It ranked #2 on the Pop House Charts/Reverbnations in Berlin. Von Schöneberg composed the music and lyrics, while the track was mixed and arranged by Konstatinos Pantzis.

In January 2018, Stèlla von Schöneberg released her album I have told you followed in April by the album Guestlist. Von Schöneberg composed the music and lyrics, while the track was mixed and arranged by Parakh Math.

In 2020, Stèlla von Schöneberg signed with Greek label Spicy Music. 

In July 2020, Stèlla von Schöneberg released the album You're my King. Ilona Creemers composed the music and lyrics, while the track was mixed and arranged by Konstatinos Pantzis. 

In March 2021, Stèlla von Schöneberg released "Is It Me?" Music, lyrics and vocals were provided by Stèlla von Schöneberg. The track was released under Proton Music Inc. Shooting for the official music video took place in New York in Greenwich Village, Christopher Street Park, and Stonewall National Monument. The song was dedicated to the equality struggle of the LGBTQ+ community and their equal rights, including the legacy of the Stonewall riots. 

In July 2021, Stèlla von Schöneberg released "Come and Find Me" with Spicy Music. Ilona Creemers composed the music and lyrics, while the track was arranged by Konstatinos Pantzis and DJ Joe Prange, and mixed by Konstatinos Pantzis. 

In December 2021, Stèlla von Schöneberg released the album You Are Forever with Spicy Music. Paul Baghdadlyan composed the music, Stèlla von Schöneberg composed the lyrics, and Konstatinos Pantzis mixed+produced the track. The track is a remake of an Armenian song. 

In August 2022, Stèlla von Schöneberg released "Holidays in Greece" through Proton Music by KP Records. Ilonna Creemers composed the music and lyrics, while Konstatinos Pantzis mixed and produced the track.

Musical style 
Stèlla von Schöneberg's live performance style mixes music, art, and fashion. She describes herself as a musician who expresses her feelings, emotion, and music as a meadow full of colorful wildflowers and insects. 

Stèlla von Schöneberg has cited pop-rock artists such as David Bowie, Madonna, Michael Jackson, George Michael, Ravi Shankar, Deep Forest, Enigma, and Fairuz among her influences.

Discography 
 Holidays In Greece (2022)
 You Are Forever (2021)
 Come And Find Me (2021)
 Is It Me? (2021)
 You're my King (2020)
 Guestlist (2018)
 Boys & Girls (2017)
 Shadows (2017)
 Homosapian (2016)
 Catwalk (2016)
 Happy Birthday (2016)
 Afterparty (2016)
 Chatroom (2016)
 Venus Power (2016)
 RoomService (2015)
 WOT (2014)
 Cosmic Energy (2012)

References

External links
 Official website

Living people
Musicians from Berlin
1978 births
Schoneberg, Stella von
21st-century German women singers